San Francisco is a rapid transit station in San Juan agglomeration, Puerto Rico. It is located between Las Lomas and Centro Médico stations on the sole line of the Tren Urbano system, in the Monacillo Urbano and Gobernador Piñero districts of the city of San Juan. The station is named after the San Francisco neighborhood located further south on José de Diego Avenue. The trial service ran in 2004, however, the regular service only started on 6 June 2005.

Nearby 
 Hospital de Veteranos (VA Caribbean Healthcare System Hospital)
Caparra Terrace neighborhood
College Park neighborhood
San Francisco neighborhood

References

Tren Urbano stations
Railway stations in the United States opened in 2004
2004 establishments in Puerto Rico